Nikita Demchenko (born 6 September 2002) is a Belarusian professional footballer who plays for Dinamo Minsk.

References

External links 
 
 
 Profile at Dinamo Minsk website

2002 births
Living people
Belarusian footballers
Association football midfielders
FC Dinamo Minsk players
FC Smolevichi players